Twin Transit is a public transit system serving the cities of Centralia and Chehalis in Lewis County, Washington. It operates four local transit bus routes and two cross-county bus routes, along with options for Dial-A-Ride and paratransit. The agency was founded in 1976 and began operating on November 1, 1977.

The first hydrogen fueling station in Washington state, located in Chehalis, will be initially administered by Twin Transit.

History

Public transportation service in Lewis County was originally operated by private companies under city-granted franchises. The operating franchise for Centralia and Chehalis was held by the Tri-City Transit Company of Aberdeen until 1953, when it was acquired by the Twin City Transit Company. The company operated an hourly bus between Centralia and Chehalis, but had financial difficulties and proposed ceasing operations several times in the 1950s and 1960s. In January 1972, the Twin Transit Company planned to shut down but was ordered by the Washington Utilities and Transportation Commission to continue for 30-days per its franchise agreement while the local government searched for an alternative. The company debuted a short-lived dial-a-ride service in April 1972 to save costs, but it was shut down three months later due to operating losses.

A citizens group was formed in 1972 to advocate for a permanent public transit system in Lewis County, while a charity service provided free buses in lieu of the Twin City Transit Company. The Centralia city government established its own single-route bus service in December 1973, using two used coaches purchased from the Bellingham Transit Company, but it attracted few riders. The city government had also planned to recoup some operating costs by selling advertisements, but found few businesses willing to pay. A household utility tax of under $1 per month was proposed to fund an expanded public transit system and an advisory vote was placed on the November 1975 ballot in Chehalis and Centralia. The non-binding endorsement of a household utility tax passed by 51.4 percent in Chehalis and 53.6 percent in Centralia.

The Lewis County government organized a public transportation benefit area and held several meetings to determine its boundaries, which initially included the Twin Cities and surrounding unincorporated areas. A binding measure to establish a household utility tax was placed on the November 2, 1976, ballot and was passed by 53.5 percent of voters. The Lewis Public Transportation Benefit Area Authority, branded as Twin Transit, was created by the ballot measure and began collecting household utility taxes ahead of a launch scheduled for 1977. Twin Transit began operating on November 1, 1977, with two routes and used coaches acquired from the Centralia bus system. In its first month of free service, the system carried 9,000 passengers but suffered from maintenance issues that affected its older coaches. The household tax was replaced by a 0.1 percent sales tax in 1985.

In the early 2000s, Twin Transit collaborated with several local transit agencies to operate experimental inter-city services to Longview (connecting onward to Vancouver) and Olympia with funding from the Lower Columbia Community Action Council. The agency consolidated several routes and eliminated most weekend service in 2013, but debuted a commuter route to Olympia.

A grant of $37,000 from the TransAlta Coal Transition Board in 2017 helped to fund the transit system's first electric bus charging station. In 2020, Twin Transit announced plans to purchase its first battery electric buses with an order for two converted Gillig Phantom coaches. The agency also plans to purchase two hydrogen fuel cell buses following the completion of the first hydrogen refueling station in the state, funded by grants awarded to the Chehalis city government.

In 2021, Lewis County and the city of Chehalis were awarded $4.45 million in grants to construct a hydrogen fueling station, to be the first in Washington. Construction is scheduled to be completed in 2023 on Port of Chehalis property and would produce up to 2 megawatts.

Routes

Twin Transit offers four fixed-route lines and two inter-county commuter services. These routes are:

 Red Line: Chehalis
 Orange Line: West Centralia
 Blue Line: North Centralia
 Yellow Line: Centralia - Chehalis Express
 Green Line: Centralia - Olympia
 Purple Line: Centralia - Castle Rock

In May 2021, Twin Transit introduced an overhauled system with four fixed-route lines and a fifth inter-county commuter service. The routes are color coded to match local school colors.

An inter-county commuter route, named the Green Line, operates from the Mellen Street e-Transit Station in Centralia to the Tumwater Transit Hub, with onward connections to Intercity Transit. The agency previously had the Capital Commuter, a route to the Washington State Capitol in Olympia, that debuted in November 2013, but the route was eliminated in September 2014 as part of a service reduction that also included all Sunday service.

Twin Transit coordinates with a Thurston County commuter program, Rural Transit, that allows riders in more rural areas of Lewis County to have access to the intercounty bus system. , Rural Transit links with Twin Transit at Centralia's Amtrak station; there are future plans to connect the program at the Mellen Street Station. The free-to-ride service is weekday only.

On August 15, 2022, Twin Transit introduced the new fixed-route line to Castle Rock.

Other services

The local Dial-A-Ride service, named DARTT, works in conjunction with Twin Transit's fixed routes and provides riders service beyond Chehalis and Centralia. The paratransit system, named LIFTT, is used for any rider medically unable to use the fixed route system.

References

External links

Bus transportation in Washington (state)
Centralia, Washington
Chehalis, Washington
Transportation in Lewis County, Washington